Kurimakhi (Dargwa: Куримахьи) is a rural locality (a selo) in Urkhuchimakhinsky Selsoviet, Akushinsky District, Republic of Dagestan, Russia. The population was 1,144 as of 2010.

Geography 
Kurimakhi is located 7 km northwest of Akusha (the district's administrative centre) by road, on the Akusha River. Urgumakhi is the nearest rural locality.

References 

Rural localities in Akushinsky District